Olubayo Sowale is an Anglican bishop in Nigeria:  he is the current Bishop of Ilesa South West.

He was consecrates on 12 January 2009 in Ughelli, Delta State.

References

Living people
Anglican bishops of Ilesa South West
21st-century Anglican bishops in Nigeria
Year of birth missing (living people)